Michaela Michalopoulou (born 20 April 1980) is a Greek handball player who competed in the 2004 Summer Olympics.

References

1980 births
Living people
Greek female handball players
Olympic handball players of Greece
Handball players at the 2004 Summer Olympics
Sportspeople from Piraeus